Dasyceras is an early phylloceratid from the Sinemurian stage of the lower Jurassic, found in Europe.

The shell is evolute, compressed in section. Inner whorls are smooth, outer mature whorl develops coarse falcoid ribs that arise near the umbilical rim but to not pass over the rounded venter.

References
Notes

Bibliography
 Arkell et al., 1957. Mesozoic Ammonoidea, Treatise on Invertebrate Paleontology, Part L.  Geological Society of America.

Early Jurassic ammonites of Europe
Ammonites of Europe
Sinemurian life
Ammonitida genera
Phylloceratina